Chelatococcus daeguensis is a Gram-negative, non-spore-forming bacteria from the genus of Chelatococcus which was isolated from wastewater of a textile dye works in Daegu in the Republic of Korea.

References

External links
Type strain of Chelatococcus daeguensis at BacDive -  the Bacterial Diversity Metadatabase

Hyphomicrobiales
Bacteria described in 2008